Outback Rabbis is a 2017 Australian documentary film on the Chabad Hasidic rabbis who seek out Jewish people living in regional and rural Australia. The documentary was directed by filmmaker Danny Ben-Moshe and aired on the SBS Australian television channel as part of its "Untold Australia" series in 2018.

The format of the film follows two rabbis and their wives who explain their mission and activities.

See also 
 The Rabbi Goes West
 Gut Shabbes Vietnam

References 

Films about Orthodox and Hasidic Jews
2017 documentary films
Films about Chabad
Australian documentary films
Jews and Judaism in Australia
Films set in the Outback
2010s Australian films